Las Lomas is a rapid transit station in San Juan agglomeration, Puerto Rico. It is located between Martínez Nadal and San Francisco stations on the sole line of the Tren Urbano system, in the Monacillo Urbano district of the city of San Juan. The station is named after Las Lomas neighborhood which it serves. The trial service ran in 2004, however, the regular service only started on 6 June 2005.

Nearby 
 Altamesa neighborhood
 Las Lomas neighborhood
 Hospital Metropolitano de San Juan

References

Tren Urbano stations
Railway stations in the United States opened in 2004
2004 establishments in Puerto Rico